Foveated rendering is a rendering technique which uses an eye tracker integrated with a virtual reality headset to reduce the rendering workload by greatly reducing the image quality in the peripheral vision (outside of the zone gazed by the fovea).

A less sophisticated variant called fixed foveated rendering doesn't utilise eye tracking and instead assumes a fixed focal point.

History 
At Tech Crunch Disrupt SF 2014, Fove unveiled a headset featuring foveated rendering. This was followed by a successful kickstarter in May 2015.

At CES 2016, SensoMotoric Instruments (SMI) demoed a new 250 Hz eye tracking system and a working foveated rendering solution. It resulted from a partnership with camera sensor manufacturer Omnivision who provided the camera hardware for the new system.

In July 2016, Nvidia demonstrated during SIGGRAPH a new method of foveated rendering claimed to be invisible to users.

In February 2017, Qualcomm announced their Snapdragon 835 Virtual Reality Development Kit (VRDK) which includes foveated rendering support called Adreno Foveation.

During CES 2019 on January 7 HTC announced an upcoming virtual reality headset called Vive Pro Eye featuring eye-tracking and support for foveated rendering.

In December 2019, Facebook's Oculus Quest SDK gave developers access to dynamic fixed foveated rendering, allowing the variation in level of detail to be changed on the fly via an API.

On January 4, 2022, Sony announced that their follow-up to PlayStation VR will include eye tracking and foveated rendering.

Use 

According to chief scientist Michael Abrash at Oculus, utilising foveated rendering in conjunction with sparse rendering and deep learning image reconstruction has the potential to require an order of magnitude fewer pixels to be rendered in comparison to a full image. Later, these results have been demonstrated and published.

See also
 Foveated imaging
 Fovea
 Gaze-contingency paradigm
 Digital image processing

References

External links 
Microsoft white paper on foveated rendering

Virtual reality
Computer vision